The 2021–22 Notre Dame Fighting Irish men's ice hockey season was the 62nd season of play for the program. They represented the University of Notre Dame in the 2021–22 NCAA Division I men's ice hockey season. This season marked the fifth season in the Big Ten Conference. They were coached by Jeff Jackson, in his 17th season, and played their home games at Compton Family Ice Arena.

Season
After a horribly disappointing situation that saw them have to withdraw from the 2021 NCAA tournament, Notre Dame entered the season with high expectations. They began the year alternating between junior Ryan Bischel and graduate transfer Matthew Galajda in goal with both performing wonderfully in goal. During the season both goaltenders were among the top 10 in the nation for goals against average and kept the Fighting Irish in contention for just about every game.

During the first half of the year ND stayed in the second 10 of the polls until a showdown with Michigan just before Thanksgiving. The Irish managed to beat the top-ranked Wolverines twice on the road, firmly establishing themselves as a tournament hopeful. While they earned splits over each of the succeeding weekends to weaker teams, the losses didn't hurt their postseason chances too much.

On the offensive side, Notre Dame didn't have much in the way of a star scorer but the team worked well overall. The Fighting Irish averages over three goals a game and typically scored when they needed to, generating offense from all four lines. The balanced play enabled Notre Dame to put together an even better second half and, as the season progressed, the Irish slowly moved up into the top 10. In the final week of the regular season, they played Michigan once more, this time at home, and Notre Dame again swept the vaunted Wolverines, all but guaranteeing them a spot in the NCAA tournament.

In the Big Ten tournament, the Irish got a slight scare from Wisconsin when they lost the first game. Despite firing 50 shots on goal, the offense continued to attack in the next two games and the Badgers' defense couldn't repeat the same performance. When Notre Dame won the series they moved up to 6 in the PairWise rankings and were mathematically guaranteed a spot in the tournament. Despite that, the team was chomping at the bit to defeat Michigan for a 5th time that season as the two met in the conference semifinals. Unfortunately for the Irish, their offense would not get on track and they could only manage 20 shots in the game, losing 1–2.

NCAA tournament
Despite the setback, Notre Dame looked ready to go once the NCAA tournament began. They took on North Dakota in what was expected to be a very even match (the two were ranked 9th and 7th respectively). Both teams played a very defensive style which kept both the shot total and scoring chances low. The Fighting Hawks got on the board at the end of the first but the Irish responded with their own just over a minute after the second began. Both defenses held strong for the balance of the game but a breakdown on a North Dakota power play as time was expiring gave Notre Dame a chance. The puck was fired into the top of the net right before the final buzzer and the Irish began to celebrate but, upon review, there was a problem with the clock. One of the game clocks still had time remaining but the official clock had already expired. After a lengthy review, the goal was ruled to have entered after time expired and the two teams required overtime. With North Dakota still on the power play, the Hawks made a mistake at the Irish blueline and took a penalty in order to stop a Notre Dame breakaway. Once the ND penalty expired, the Fighing Irish got to work and engineered an overtime winner from Graham Slaggert to send them to the quarterfinals.

In the Regional finals, Notre Dame faced off against #1 ranked Minnesota State but the Irish were undaunted. Notre Dame played the same hard defensive game that had worked for them all season but their offense, which was lacking high-end firepower, could not solve the equally strong resistance from the Mavericks. While Notre Dame was outshot, they had several opportunities to score but they could get nothing past Dryden McKay and the single goal that Galajda allowed was enough to end their season.

Departures

Recruiting

Roster
As of September 17, 2021.

Standings

Schedule and results

|-
!colspan=12 style=";" | Exhibition

|-
!colspan=12 style=";" | Regular season

|-
!colspan=12 style=";" | 

|-
!colspan=12 style=";" |

Scoring statistics

Goaltending statistics

Rankings

Note: USCHO did not release a poll in week 24.

Awards and honors

Players drafted into the NHL

2022 NHL Entry Draft

† incoming freshman

References

External links

2021–22
Notre Dame Fighting Irish
Notre Dame Fighting Irish
Notre Dame Fighting Irish
Notre Dame Fighting Irish